Who Got the Gravy? is the fifth album by rap group Digital Underground, which reached No. 91 on the Top R&B/Hip-Hop Albums chart.

The album features guest appearances from Big Pun, Biz Markie, and KRS-One. It marks the debut of Esinchill and female emcee Mystic. Shock G's character, "Peanut Hakeem Anafu Washington," was also introduced.

Track listing
"I Shall Return (Intro)" (With KRS-One) (1:38)
"Holla Holiday" (5:27)
"Wind Me Up" (With Esinchill) (6:56)
"The Mission" (With Big Pun) (5:08)
"The Odd Couple" (With Biz Markie) (3:26)
"Blind Mice" (5:09)
"The Gravy" (With Truck Turner of BDP) (4:54)
"Peanut Hakeem" (2:57)
"Mans Girl" (8:17)
"April Showers" (With Mystic) (5:09)
"Cyber Teeth Tigers" (With KRS One) (3:46)

References

1998 albums
Digital Underground albums
Jake Records albums